The Habeas Corpus Act 1679  is an Act of Parliament in England (31 Cha. 2 c. 2) during the reign of King Charles II. It was passed by what became known as the Habeas Corpus Parliament to define and strengthen the ancient prerogative writ of habeas corpus, which required a court to examine the lawfulness of a prisoner's detention and thus prevent unlawful or arbitrary imprisonment.

Earlier and subsequent history

The Act is often wrongly described as the origin of the writ of habeas corpus. But the writ of habeas corpus had existed in various forms in England for at least five centuries before and is thought to have originated in the Assize of Clarendon of 1166. It was guaranteed, but not created, by Magna Carta in 1215, whose article 39 reads (translated from Latin): "No freeman shall be taken or imprisoned or disseised or exiled or in any way destroyed, nor will we go upon him nor will we send upon him except upon the lawful judgement of his peers or the law of the land." The Act of 1679 followed an earlier Habeas Corpus Act of 1640, which established that the command of the King or the Privy Council was no answer to a petition of habeas corpus. Further Habeas Corpus Acts were passed by the British Parliament in 1803, 1804, 1816, and 1862, but it is the Act of 1679 which is remembered as one of the most important statutes in English constitutional history. Though amended, it remains on the statute book to this day.

Content
In criminal matters other than treason and felonies (a distinction which no longer exists), the act gave prisoners or third parties acting on their behalf the right to challenge their detention by demanding from the Lord Chancellor, Justices of the King's Bench, and the Barons of the Exchequer of the jurisdiction a judicial review of their imprisonment. The act laid out certain temporal and geographical conditions under which prisoners had to be brought before the courts. Jailors were forbidden to move prisoners from one prison to another or out of the country to evade the writ. In case of disobedience jailers would be punished with severe fines which had to be paid to the prisoner.

Parliamentary history
The Act came about because the Earl of Shaftesbury encouraged his friends in the Commons to introduce the Bill where it passed and was then sent up to the House of Lords. Shaftesbury was the leading Exclusionist—those who wanted to exclude Charles II's brother James, Duke of York from the succession—and the Bill was a part of that struggle as they believed James would rule arbitrarily. The Lords decided to add many wrecking amendments to the Bill in an attempt to kill it; the Commons had no choice but to pass the Bill with the Lords' amendments because they learned that the King would soon end the current parliamentary session.

A popular but likely untrue anecdote holds claims that the Act only passed because the votes in favour were miscounted as a joke. When a parliamentary house votes on legislation, each side—those voting for and against—appoints a teller who stands on each side of a door through which those Lords who vote "aye" re-enter the House (the "nays" remain seated). One teller counts aloud whilst the other teller listens and keeps watch to verify the count. Of the Habeas Corpus Act count, Gilbert Burnet wrote,Lord Grey and Lord Norris were named to be the tellers: Lord Norris, being a man subject to vapours, was not at all times attentive to what he was doing: so, a very fat lord coming in, Lord Grey counted him as ten, as a jest at first: but seeing Lord Norris had not observed it, he went on with this misreckoning of ten: so it was reported that they that were for the Bill were in the majority, though indeed it went for the other side: and by this means the Bill passed.In the words of historian Helen Nutting, this miscount story is "highly improbable". Proponents of the story cite as supporting evidence a discrepancy between the vote total and the attendance count in the parliamentary minutes: the clerk recorded in the minutes of the Lords that the "ayes" had fifty-seven and the "nays" had fifty-five, a total of 112, but the same minutes also state that only 107 Lords had attended that sitting. However, the attendance counts in the minute book were frequently inaccurate, and the attendance count is off by five rather than nine, undermining rather than supporting Burnet's reminiscence. According to Nutting, had the vote been miscounted, James would almost certainly have "taken advantage of a real miscount to overturn the act", since he opposed it.

King Charles II assented to the Act in 1679 since, Nutting explains, "it was no longer controversial". The Act is now stored in the Parliamentary Archives.

Application in New Zealand 
The Habeas Corpus Act 1679 and the later acts of 1803, 1804, 1816 and 1862 were reprinted in New Zealand as Imperial Acts in force in New Zealand in 1881.

See also 
 Magna Carta
 Petition of Right
 Bill of Rights

Notes

References

External links 

 Habeas Corpus Act The British Library
 The Parliamentary Archives holds the original of this historic record
 Full Habeas Corpus Act (U. of Chicago)
 Full Habeas Corpus Act with link to source
 Other Habeas Corpus materials (U. of Chicago)
 (Partial) Text of the 1679 Habeas Corpus Act
 Images of the original act from the Parliamentary Archives

Acts of the Parliament of England
Acts of the Parliament of England still in force
1679 in law
Constitutional laws of England
1679 in England
Habeas corpus
Civil rights and liberties legislation
Civil rights and liberties in the United Kingdom